Seim may refer:

Seim language, a Sepik language of Papua New Guinea

Places
Seim, Vestland, a village in Alver municipality, Vestland county, Norway
Seimsdalen, a valley in Årdal municipality, Vestland county, Norway
Seim River, or Seym, a river in Ukraine

People
Eugen Seim (1896–1943), a Nazi German officer during World War II
Gotskalk Mathiassen Seim (born 1818), a Norwegian politician
Gunhild Seim (born 1973), a Norwegian jazz musician and composer
Mart Seim (born 1990), an Estonian weightlifter
Spencer Seim (born 1981), an American guitarist in the band Hella
Trond Espen Seim (born 1971), a Norwegian actor
Trygve Seim, a Norwegian jazz saxophonist and composer
Turid Karlsen Seim (1945–2016), Norwegian professor of theology

See also
Saeima
Seam (disambiguation)
Seem (disambiguation)
SEM (disambiguation)
Seimas
Sejm
SIEM